The Adana bleak (Alburnus adanensis) is a species of freshwater fish in the family Cyprinidae, endemic to the Ceyhan and Seyhan river watersheds in Turkey.

References

Alburnus
Fish described in 1944
Endemic fauna of Turkey